John Newcombe defeated Onny Parun in the final, 6–3, 6–7, 7–5, 6–1 to win the men's singles tennis title at the 1973 Australian Open.

Ken Rosewall was the two-time defending champion, but lost in the second round to Karl Meiler.

The first round was best of 3 sets and the rest of the tournament was best of 5 sets.

Seeds
The seeded players are listed below. John Newcombe is the champion; others show the round in which they were eliminated.

  Ken Rosewall (second round)
  John Newcombe (champion)
  Mal Anderson (second round)
  Alex Metreveli (quarterfinals)
  Geoff Masters (third round)
  John Alexander (second round)
  Colin Dibley (second round)
  Allan Stone (third round)
  Barry Phillips-Moore (second round)
  Bob Carmichael (quarterfinals)
  Patrick Proisy (semifinals)
  Onny Parun (final)

Draw

Key
 Q = Qualifier

Final eight

Section 1

Section 2

Section 3

Section 4

External links
 Association of Tennis Professionals (ATP) – 1973 Australian Open Men's Singles draw
 1973 Australian Open – Men's draws and results at the International Tennis Federation

Mens singles
Australian Open (tennis) by year – Men's singles